The Wakatipu Wild is a New Zealand amateur ice hockey team from Queenstown, Otago, New Zealand. Founded in 2020, the Wild are a member of the New Zealand Women's Ice Hockey League (NZWIHL). The Wild are based at Queenstown Ice Arena, located at Queenstown Gardens. Wakatipu are one time NZWIHL champions and premiers.

History

The Wakatipu Wild was founded in 2020 and applied and joined the New Zealand Women's Ice Hockey League (NZWIHL). The Wild was established to bring women of all ages and nationalities together to further the development of woman's ice hockey locally i Otago and nationally in New Zealand. Wakatipu appointed Rebecca Dobson as their maiden general manager and former Skycity Stampede player Colin McIntosh as head coach. Thew Wild's first ever game was played on 16 October 2020 against Otago rivals Dunedin Thunder on the road at Dunedin Ice Stadium. Young kiwi forward, Tallulah Bryant, scored the first ever goals for the Wild in the first period against Dunedin. Wakatipu doubled their lead in the second period before the Thunder pulled one goal back in the third. That third period goal proved a simple consolation as the wild won the game 2–1, for their first ever victory. Queenstown finished their first season in the NZWIHL in third place, qualifying for the bronze medal game in the NZWIHL Finals. The Wild won bronze in Finals on 1 November 2020 by defeating the Thunder 4–2. Wakatipu came from behind to claim their first Finals win, with American import and team captain, Kellye Nelson, scoring a hat-trick of goals over the course of the second and third periods.

Half way through the 2021 NZWIHL season, the Wild's second season, the league was cancelled due to the lock-downs implemented by the New Zealand Government during the COVID-19 pandemic. The team had started the season well with two wins from their first three games before the season cancellation. 

In 2022, the Wild had a breakout season in their second full NZWIHL season. Rather than tournament style weekends, the league moved to a proper round-robin format that the Wild players enjoyed. Wakatipu almost went the entire season undefeated to finish top of the league standings a secure their first NZWIHL Premiership title. Queenstown followed up this success in the NZWIHL Finals with a big 7–2 victory over the Thunder in the semi-finals before being crowned Champions of New Zealand and winning goal medals with a 2–0 win over Canterbury Inferno in the grand final.

All-time record

1 At the point of the 2021 season cancellation, the Wild had played three games, won twice, lost once, scored 15 goals and conceded eight goals.

Championships

Championships 
 Champions (1): 2022
 Runners-up (0): 

Premierships
 Premiers (1): 2022
 Runner-up (0):

Players

Current roster

Team roster for the 2022 NZWIHL season.

Player records

These are the top-five all-time/career player records in franchise history. Current as of 2022 NZWIHL season.

Team staff

Current as of 2023 NZWIHL season.

Leaders

Team captains

The Wild have had one captain in the team's history.

References:

head coaches

The Wild have had one head coach in the team's history.

References:

General managers

The Wild have had one general manager (GM) in the team's history.

References:

Broadcasting

Current:
 YouTube (2020 – present) – The NZWIHL self broadcast league games live on YouTube on their official channel. Due to limited resources, not all games are broadcast.

References

External links

 Offical website
 Offical NZWIHL website
 Offical Facebook
 Elite Prospects team profile

New Zealand Women's Ice Hockey League teams
Ice hockey teams in New Zealand
Sport in Queenstown, New Zealand
2020 establishments in New Zealand
Ice hockey clubs established in 2020